The Resolve is a 1915 American silent short drama film directed by Henry Otto starring Ed Coxen, Lizette Thorne, and Winifred Greenwood.

Cast
 Ed Coxen as Steven Brooks
 Lizette Thorne as Mrs. Stephen Brooks
 Winifred Greenwood as Nell
 Charlotte Burton
 George Field
 Lillian Knight
 John Steppling

External links

1915 films
1915 drama films
Silent American drama films
American silent short films
American black-and-white films
Films directed by Henry Otto
1915 short films
1910s American films
1910s English-language films
American drama short films